Bushiri is an African surname. Notable people with the surname include:

Ladislas Bushiri (born 1986), Congolese-Canadian soccer player
Rocky Bushiri (born 1999), Belgian football player 
Shepherd Bushiri (born 1983), Malawian Christian preacher, motivational speaker, author, and businessman